"Nice Guy" is a song by American rapper Eminem and Canadian singer Jessie Reyez from the former's tenth studio album Kamikaze, released on August 31, 2018 via Shady Records.  Produced by Fred Ball and Symbolyc One with additional production by Eminem, recording sessions took place at Effigy Studios in Detroit. Despite never being released as a single, the song has managed to chart in several countries.

Aja Romano of Vox wrote: "'Nice Guy' and 'Good Guy' both trade on the popular conception of the "nice guy" as an embodiment of the kind of entitled misogyny that leads to the violence we see in "Normal". It's not exactly groundbreaking, and as always, it's so difficult to uncouple Em's critique of misogyny from actual misogyny that it might as well be one and the same". Craig Jenkins of Vulture.com wrote: "The methodical Jessie Reyez raps on "Nice Guy" nudge the marquee artist toward pointed story raps that revisit his old glory, when songs gripped with emotion and honesty, not just a barrage of internal rhymes. The melodic relationship raps on the back end of "Normal" pose the question of how much better this half of Eminem's decade could've gone had he poured himself into collaborations with guys like Drake and Future instead of writing their entire wing of rap off as heralds of some coming real hip-hop apocalypse".

Personnel
Marshall Mathers – vocals, additional producer, mixing, songwriter
Jessie Reyez – vocals, songwriter
Larry Griffin Jr. – producer, songwriter
Fred Ball – producer, songwriter
Luis Resto – additional keyboards, songwriter
Mike Strange – recording, mixing
Joe Strange – recording
Tony Campana – recording

Charts

References

2018 songs
Eminem songs
Jessie Reyez songs
Songs written by Eminem
Songs written by Jessie Reyez
Songs written by Symbolyc One
Songs written by Fred Ball (producer)
Songs written by Luis Resto (musician)
Song recordings produced by Symbolyc One
Industrial hip hop songs
Song recordings produced by Eminem